Gradnitsa, Dobrich Province is a village in Tervel Municipality, Dobrich Province, in northeastern Bulgaria.

The village has 352 inhabitants as of 2011 and is mainly inhabited by ethnic  Turks. Most people are  Muslim.

References

Villages in Dobrich Province